Malcolm H. B. McDonald is a British educator and the first marketing professor to have created an application for iPhone and to have recorded his full lectures.

Malcolm McDonald was until recently Professor of Marketing and Deputy Director at Cranfield University School of Management, and is now an Emeritus Professor at the university as well as being an Honorary Professor at Warwick Business School. He has been consultant to many major companies from the United Kingdom, Europe, USA, Far East, South-East Asia, Australasia and Africa, in the areas of strategic marketing and marketing planning, market segmentation, key account management, international marketing and marketing accountability. McDonald is also Chairman of six companies and works with the operating boards of some multinational corporations.

He has written over 40 books including Marketing Plans: How to prepare them, how to use them translated into French.

Together with Tony Millman and Beth Rogers, Professor McDonald was involved in Cranfield's first research projects on the topic of key account management.

Publications 
Market Segmentation: How to do it, how to profit from it   Elsevier (1998)
Marketing plans: How to prepare, them how to use them  Elsevier(2007)
Key Account Management: the definitive guide  Elsevier (2007)
Marketing Due Diligence: Reconnecting  Strategy to Share Price  Elsevier (2007)

References

External links 

Living people
Marketing theorists
Year of birth missing (living people)